The Line 3 of Wuhan Metro is a metro line in Wuhan. This line crosses five districts of Wuhan: Jiang'an District, Jianghan District, Qiaokou District, Hanyang District and Caidian District (Wuhan Economic-Technological Zone, WEDZ), and is the first line to cross the Han River. It started operation on December 28, 2015.

History

On February 23, 2012, National Development and Reform Commission approved all construction of Line 3 and construction started on March 31. All tunnels of Line 3 were finished on October 8, 2015, and all tracks were finished on October 28, 2015. It started operation on December 28, 2015.

Stations

Rolling stock

The first train of Line 3 arrived on March 25, 2015 from CRRC Changchun Railway Vehicles. A further order of 19 six car sets was made in 2019.

References

 
2015 establishments in China
Railway lines opened in 2015